Sullivantia, commonly called coolwort, is a genus of flowering plants in the saxifrage family. It is a small genus, comprising only 3-4 species of perennial herbs all native to the United States. Sullivantia is most notable for having disjunct distributions primarily restricted to along the Pleistocene glacial margin. All species of Sullivantia are found on moist, often calcareous cliffs.

Species
 Sullivantia hapemanii
 Sullivantia oregana
 Sullivantia sullivantii

References

Saxifragaceae
Flora of the United States
Saxifragaceae genera